Sulcospira agrestis is a species of freshwater snail with an operculum, an aquatic gastropod mollusk in the family Pachychilidae.

Distribution 
This species occurs in Sabah, Borneo, Malaysia.

The type locality is Borneo.

References

External links 

Pachychilidae
Gastropods described in 1860
Taxobox binomials not recognized by IUCN